The women's 1500 metre freestyle competition at the 2010 Pan Pacific Swimming Championships took place on August 21 at the William Woollett Jr. Aquatics Center.  The last champion was Kate Ziegler of US.

This event was a timed-final where each swimmer swam just once. The top 8 seeded swimmers swam in the evening, and the remaining swimmers swam in the morning session.

Records
Prior to this competition, the existing world and Pan Pacific records were as follows:

Results
All times are in minutes and seconds.

The first round was held on August 21, at 11:19, and the final was held on August 21, at 20:09.

References

2010 Pan Pacific Swimming Championships
2010 in women's swimming